Abdou Kader Mangane (born 23 March 1983) is a Senegalese former professional footballer who played as a defender. He spent most of his career in France. At international level, he made 23 appearances for the Senegal national team scoring 1 goal.

Club career
Mangane began his career in his native Senegal before joining Switzerland and Neuchâtel Xamax in 2001, where he spent six years. He then went to play five seasons in French Ligue 1, for Lens during the 2007–08 season, and Rennes.

On 17 July 2012, Mangane signed a three-year contract with Saudi club Al-Hilal for an undisclosed fee.

He joined English Premier League team Sunderland on loan until the end of the season on 14 January 2013.

On 31 July 2015, Mangane signed for Gazélec Ajaccio on a one-year contract.

Controversy
On 21 March 2009, during a Ligue 1 game against Valenciennes he seriously injured opposing midfielder Jonathan Lacourt in a challenge which resulted in a double fracture of the tibia and fibula. He was suspended until 1 June 2009.

Personal life
Mangane obtained French nationality on 16 May 2011.

References

External links

1983 births
Living people
Footballers from Dakar
Senegalese footballers
Senegal international footballers
Senegalese expatriate footballers
Senegalese expatriate sportspeople in England
Senegalese expatriate sportspeople in Saudi Arabia
2012 Africa Cup of Nations players
Al Hilal SFC players
Association football defenders
Association football midfielders
BSC Young Boys players
Expatriate footballers in England
Expatriate footballers in Saudi Arabia
Expatriate footballers in Turkey
Gazélec Ajaccio players
Kayseri Erciyesspor footballers
Ligue 1 players
Ligue 2 players
Neuchâtel Xamax FCS players
Premier League players
RC Lens players
RC Strasbourg Alsace players
Saudi Professional League players
Stade Rennais F.C. players
Sunderland A.F.C. players
Süper Lig players
Swiss Super League players
US Rail players